Mildmay Park railway station is a former railway station on the North London Line, located between Canonbury and Dalston Kingsland stations. The station was located on Mildmay Park between Newington Green and Balls Pond Road.

History 

The North London Railway from Dalston Junction to Highbury & Islington was opened on 26 September 1850, although the station was not opened until 1 January 1880. It was closed by the London, Midland and Scottish Railway on 1 October 1934. The ticket office that was located on brick columns over the eastbound track was demolished in 1987. Some remnants of the platforms are still visible.

References

External links
Disused stations - Mildmay Park

Disused railway stations in the London Borough of Islington
Former North London Railway stations
Railway stations in Great Britain opened in 1880
Railway stations in Great Britain closed in 1934
Demolished buildings and structures in England